The smc Pentax-DA 10-17mm f/3.5-4.5 ED (IF) Fish-Eye lens is a fisheye zoom lens for the Pentax K-mount. It offers an up to 180 degree view, and allows quick shift focus (Pentax's term for giving the photographer the ability to manually focus the lens even when the camera is in autofocus mode without damaging the lens or camera).

History and design
A patent for the lens design was filed on 30 August 2005, and granted in 2008. The design is credited to Takayuki Ito and Jun Hirakawa. Pentax announced the lens on November 30, 2005, with availability to commence in January 2006. It was designed in conjunction with Tokina, who would later market a self-branded version in Nikon AF-D and Canon EF mounts starting in October 2006. The 10–17mm lens was seen as a re-release of the earlier Pentax F 17–28mm lens introduced in the mid-1990s, providing similar functionality with the focal lengths and coverage updated for APS-C format digital SLRs. Compared to the earlier lens, the 10-17mm lens has improved close-focus capability.

Glass technologies used in this lens include ED glass for low dispersion and reducing chromatic aberration, as well as the SP super-protect coating for repelling dust, grease and water. It has a 35mm equivalent focal length of 15mm-26mm.

Gallery

See also
 Pentax F 17–28mm, the world's first fisheye zoom lens

References

External links

 Pentax Ricoh Imaging Americas Corp., smc PENTAX DA 10-17mm F3.5-4.5 ED (IF) Fish-Eye

PENTAX UNVEILS DIGITAL FISH-EYE LENS, Pentax Press Release 
PENTAX introduces the new smc PENTAX-DA FISH-EYE 10-17mm F3.5-4.5ED [IF], Pentax Press Release
 

10-17
Fisheye lenses